{{DISPLAYTITLE:C22H27FN2O}}
The molecular formula C22H27FN2O (molar mass: 354.46 g/mol) may refer to:

 NFEPP
 Orthofluorofentanyl
 Parafluorofentanyl (4-Fluorofentanyl)

Molecular formulas